George Arthur Woolley (1877 – 22 July 1917) was an English footballer who played as a goalkeeper in the Football League for Chesterfield Town.

Personal life
Prior to the First World War, Woolley worked as a miner in Codnor and Pinxton. At the outbreak of the war, he enlisted in the Sherwood Foresters; due to his profession, he was transferred to the Royal Engineers and joined the 177th Tunnelling Company. He was severely wounded in May 1915, but recovered and returned to his company, which was positioned at Railway Wood, Hooge. On 22 July 1917, Corporal  Woolley was supervising a dugout when gas shells hit the position. He went inside the dugout to assist other soldiers, but was killed in the process of doing so. Woolley is commemorated on a memorial at the RE Grave, Railway Wood.

Career statistics

References

1877 births
Date of birth missing
1917 deaths
People from Amber Valley
Footballers from Derbyshire
Association football goalkeepers
English footballers
English Football League players
Ilkeston Town F.C. (1880s) players
Staveley F.C. players
Chesterfield F.C. players
English miners
British Army personnel of World War I
Sherwood Foresters soldiers
Royal Engineers soldiers
British military personnel killed in World War I
Military personnel from Derbyshire